This is a list of French football transfers for the 2022–23 summer transfer window. Only transfers featuring Ligue 1 and Ligue 2 are listed.

Transfers

References 

French
2022–23 in French football
2021-23